Philip Henry Griffiths (25 October 1905 – 14 May 1978) was a Welsh international footballer. He won his only cap for Wales in 1931. He started and ended his career at Port Vale, and also had spells with Everton, West Bromwich Albion, Cardiff City, and Folkestone Town. He played in the Southern League and in every division of the Football League, winning the Third Division North title with Port Vale in 1929–30, and winning the First Division title with Everton in 1931–32.

Career
Griffiths played for Tylorstown and Wattstown and, after failing a trial with Stoke City, joined Port Vale following a trial period in August 1926. He had walked 170 miles to Stoke-on-Trent from South Wales to win a contract at one of the Potteries clubs. He played one Second Division game in the 1926–27 season, and featured 11 times in the 1927–28 campaign. He scored his first goal in the Football League on 14 April 1928, in a 3–0 win over Blackpool at The Old Recreation Ground. He scored against rivals Stoke City in a 2–1 defeat at the Victoria Ground on 15 September, and went on to play six matches in the 1928–29 season, claiming his third career goal on the last day of the season, in a 5–0 home win over Bristol City. The "Valiants" were relegated, and Griffiths established himself in the first team in the Third Division North, claiming 14 goals in 31 appearances as Vale won promotion as champions in the 1929–30 campaign. He went on to score 13 goals in 39 games in the 1930–31 season, and was sold to Everton for a £6,000 fee in May 1931.

Griffiths helped the "Toffees" to win the First Division title in 1931–32. Never a first team regular, he left Goodison Park at the end of the 1932–33 campaign, and moved on to West Bromwich Albion. He helped the "Throstles" to post a seventh-place finish in the First Division in 1933–34. He then left The Hawthorns to return to his native South Wales, and turned out for Third Division South side Cardiff City in the 1934–35 season. He played for Folkestone Town in the Southern League after departing Ninian Park. He returned to Port Vale in October 1939, where he was also made the "A" team coach. However with World War II he was called into active service during the 1944–45 season.

Career statistics
Source:

Honours
Port Vale
Football League Third Division North: 1929–30

Everton
Football League First Division: 1931–32

References

1905 births
1978 deaths
Welsh footballers
Wales international footballers
Association football midfielders
Port Vale F.C. players
Everton F.C. players
West Bromwich Albion F.C. players
Cardiff City F.C. players
Folkestone F.C. players
English Football League players
Southern Football League players
Association football coaches
Port Vale F.C. non-playing staff
British military personnel of World War II